Josiah Mwangi Kariuki (21 March 1929 – 2 March 1975), popularly referred to as 'JM', was a Kenyan socialist politician during the administration of Jomo Kenyatta's government. He held different government positions from Kenya's independence in 1963 until his assassination in 1975.

Early life
J. M. Kariuki was born in Kabati-ini town in Rift Valley province, to Kariuki Kigani and Mary Wanjiku. He was the only boy in a family of five siblings. In 1938, he briefly enrolled in Evanson's Day School but dropped out shortly after due to a lack of school fees.  He worked on a European settler's farm until 1946 when he won a bet on a horse at the Nakuru Races. Using his winnings he re-enrolled himself in primary school and although he attended several schools he was finally able to finish his primary education in 1950. Later, he joined King's College Budo in Uganda's Wakiso district for his secondary education.

Political life
The start of Kariuki's political career is usually traced to 1946 when he listened to a speech at a political rally in which Jomo Kenyatta denounced the way the British colonial government was treating native Kenyans. It is, however, likely that he became interested in politics at an early age. Before his birth, his parents had been displaced in 1928 from their family land, Chinga, in the Nyeri native reserve, to work in the 'White Highlands'. There, they became squatters on a European settler's farm, deprived of land rights and essentially forced to work on settler land for low wages.

In the late 1940s, he joined his primary school drama group which presented plays dramatizing efforts to resist colonial rule. While in Uganda for his secondary education, he closely followed the struggles that local Kenyans were facing from the European settlers. On 22 October 1952, he graduated from secondary school and returned to Kenya shortly before the country was placed under a State of Emergency by the new Governor, Sir Evelyn Baring, and Kariuki joined the Mau Mau uprising. After Kariuki took his oath, he started working as Mau Mau liaison officer between Eldoret and Kisumu. He also helped in soliciting money, boots and housing for Mau Mau. This led to his arrest in his hotel, which was working as a front to his political work. He was then detained in various camps (including Kowop and Langata) from 1953 until his release, seven years later in 1960.

After his release, he managed to secure Kenyatta's approval in starting Nyeri's Kenya African National Union (KANU) branch by visiting him in detention. When Kenya became independent, Kariuki worked as Kenyatta's private secretary between 1963 and 1969. In the late 1960s and early '70s, Kariuki's relationship with Kenyatta became increasingly strained as Kariuki became increasingly vocal in his criticism of Kenyatta's governmental policies and their results, including high levels of government corruption, widening inequalities, and the deterioration of relations between Kenya and other members of the East African Community. In addition, the KANU government under Kenyatta had failed to provide drought relief, and had badly mismanaged the economy in the wake of the 1973 oil crisis. A major criticism regarded the unfair distribution of land by the Kenyatta regime. After Kenya's independence, the United Kingdom government had given the Kenyatta government funds to buy back land from European settlers. However, the land bought back was never redistributed to those Kenyans who previously lived in these settled areas: instead, most of it was given as gifts to Kenyatta's family and friends or as bribes to influence political allies.

In 1974, he was elected as Nyandarua's member of parliament and became an assistant minister in the Kenyatta government between 1974 and 1975. This was despite the government having made every possible effort to thwart his re-election, because his popularity among ordinary Kenyans threatened to overshadow Kenyatta's own. He was last seen alive at the Hilton Hotel, accompanied by Kenyatta's bodyguard on 2 March 1975.

The first attempt on his life was on 1st March 1975 when a bus he was supposed to travel in to go to Mombasa was bombed. On 2 March 1975, Kariuki's remains were found in Ngong Forest by a herd boy; his hands had been chopped off, his eyes gorged out, his face burnt with acid and left on an ant's nest. When the news of Kariuki's death broke, Nairobi University students marched in protest in the streets of the capital. The march was broken up by Kenyan riot police and the campus was closed down, not reopening during Kenyatta's lifetime.

Altogether Kariuki was a larger-than-life figure on Kenya's political scene, and his violent demise was widely mourned by his compatriots. He had been a prolific giver and "Expressive Giving" best describes his philanthropy: it was prompted by his desire to express support for something larger than himself and reflected his vision for a nation whose citizens would be able to fend for themselves. Accordingly, JM's mode of giving was designed to have a measurable impact on society as a whole.

Today, JM is remembered by Kenyans predominantly as a hero. Increasingly he came to represent the force against the evils that have harmed the country to this day. A quote from him is widely remembered:

"In Kenya today, I can only see the dawn of a June morning rising majestically from the white oblivion into the serenity of life." – J. M. Kariuki (1974)

Book
Kariuki wrote Mau Mau Detainee, an account of his experience in camps during the uprising that led to Kenya's independence.

Quotes
 "Kenya has become a nation of 10 millionaires and 10 million beggars."
 "Every Kenyan man, woman and child is entitled to a decent and just living. That is a birthright. It is not a privilege. He is entitled as far as is humanly possible to equal educational, job and health opportunities irrespective of his parentage, race or creed or his area of origin in this land. If that is so, deliberate efforts should be made to eliminate all obstacles that today stand in the way of this just goal. That is the primary task of the machinery called Government: our Government."
 "We fought for independence with sweat, blood and our lives. Many of us suffered for inordinate days – directly and indirectly. Many of us are orphans, widows and children as a result of the struggle. We must ask: What did we suffer for, and were we justified in that suffering?".

Death investigation
A Parliamentary Select Committee chaired by Elijah Wasike Mwangale was immediately established to investigate the circumstances surrounding Kariuki's murder. The Committee's report assigned senior police officers: Ignatius Iriga Nderi, Ben Gethi, Wanyoike Thungu, Patrick Shaw and other senior administrative officers and politicians, but no one was ever punished. It is most likely that the committee was the means used by Kenyatta's government to mitigate a potential revolt. When the report was finally released, the anger had subsided and the likelihood of revolt was much lower.

External links
 A good biography of J.M.K from African Tribute newspaper
 BBC has a link to one of J.M.K speech
 

1929 births
1975 deaths
People from Rift Valley Province
Kikuyu people
Kenya African National Union politicians
Kenyan socialists
Assassinated Kenyan politicians
Kenyan writers
Kenyan male writers
People murdered in Kenya